is another name for Mount Fuji.

Fugaku may also refer to:

 Nakajima G10N Fugaku, a planned Japanese heavy bomber designed during World War II
 Fugaku (supercomputer), a Japanese supercomputer
 Fugaku Uchiha, a Naruto character

See also 
 , the ukiyo-e series created by Hokusai